The List of 2015 USA Gymnastics elite season participants, who competed during the 2015 elite season.

2015 U.S. National team

Seniors
 Alyssa Baumann - Plano, TX (WOGA)
 Simone Biles - Spring, TX (World Champions Centre)
 Nia Dennis - Westerville, OH (Buckeye)
 Madison Desch - Lenexa, KS (GAGE)
 Gabrielle Douglas - Virginia Beach, VA (Buckeye)
 Brenna Dowell - Norman, OK (GAGE)
 Rachel Gowey - Urbandale, IA (Chow's)
 Felicia Hano - San Gabriel, CA (Gym-Max)
 Amelia Hundley - Hamilton, OH (Cincinnati)
 Bailie Key - Montgomery, TX (Texas Dreams)
 Madison Kocian - Dallas, TX (WOGA)
 Ashton Locklear - Hamlet, NC (Everest)
 Lauren Navarro - La Verne, CA (Charter Oak Gliders)
 Maggie Nichols - Little Canada, MN (Twin City Twisters)
 Aly Raisman - Needham, MA (Brestyan's)
 Kyla Ross - Aliso Viejo, CA (Gym-Max)
 Emily Schild - Huntersville, NC (Everest)
 Megan Skaggs - Marietta, GA (GAA)
 Mykayla Skinner - Gilbert, AZ (Desert Lights)

Juniors
 Jordan Chiles - Vancouver, WA (Naydenov)
 Norah Flatley - Cumming, IA (Chow's)
 Jazmyn Foberg - Bayville, NJ (MG Elite)
 Emily Gaskins - Coral Springs, FL (Intensity)
 Laurie Hernandez - Old Bridge, NJ (MG Elite)
 Victoria Nguyen - West Des Moines, IA (Chow's)
 Ragan Smith - Lewisville, TX (Texas Dreams)
 Olivia Trautman - Champlin, MN (Twin City Twisters)

Other qualified participants

Seniors
 Ashley Foss - Towaco, NJ (North Stars)
 Veronica Hults - Coppell, TX (Texas Dreams)
 Alaina Kwan - California (All Olympia)
 Marissa Oakley - Oswego, IL (Phenom)
 Lexy Ramler - St. Michael, MN (KidSport)
 Polina Shchennikova - Arvada, CO (TIGAR)
 Anastasia Webb - Morton Grove, IL (IGI)

Juniors
 Shania Adams - Plain City, OH (Buckeye)
 McKenna Appleton - Great Falls, VA (Hill's)
 Elena Arenas - Bishop, GA (Georgia Elite)
 Rachel Baumann - Plano, TX (WOGA)
 Aria Brusch - Forest Park, OH (Cincinnati)
 Christina Desiderio - Hackettstown, NJ (Parkettes)
 Olivia Dunne - Hillsdale, NJ (ENA Paramus)
 Bailey Ferrer - Ocoee, FL (Orlando Metro)
 Colbi Flory - Texas (Texas Dreams)
 Molly Frack - Nazareth, PA (Parkettes)
 Megan Freed - Bethlehem, PA (Parkettes)

References

United States sport-related lists
Gymnastics in the United States
2015 in American sports
2015 in gymnastics